The 2004 Chennai Open was a men's tennis tournament played on outdoor hard courts at the SDAT Tennis Stadium in Chennai in India and was part of the International Series of the 2004 ATP Tour. The tournament ran from 5 January through 11 January 2004. First-seeded Carlos Moyá won the singles title.

Finals

Singles

 Carlos Moyá defeated  Paradorn Srichaphan 6–4, 3–6, 7–6(7–5)
 It was Moyá's 1st title of the year and the 14th of his career.

Doubles

 Rafael Nadal /  Tommy Robredo defeated  Jonathan Erlich /  Andy Ram 7–6(7–3), 4–6, 6–3
 It was Nadal's 1st title of the year and the 2nd of his career. It was Robredo's 1st title of the year and the 2nd of his career.

References

External links
 Official website
 ATP tournament profile

 
Chennai Open
Chennai Open
Chennai Open